Axiagasta stactogramma is the only species in the monotypic moth genus Axiagasta of the family Tineidae. It is found in Brazil. The genus name is a junior homonym that has apparently never been replaced.

References

Tineidae
Moths described in 1930
Moths of South America